2021–22 European North Basketball League was the first season of the European North Basketball League, a regional basketball competition patronised by FIBA. The tournament began on October 19, 2021.

Competition format 
A round robin tournament – at least seven games in three stages (3+2+2), followed by the Final Four in Spring of 2022. There was no games during FIBA international windows for the National teams (November 22–30, 2021; February 21-March 1, 2022). Final Four tournament was held at Włocławek.

Teams

Regular season 

1Participation of Russian and Belarusian teams suspended due to the 2022 Russian invasion of Ukraine. Thus, according to article D.5.1 of the FIBA Official Basketball Rules, all their results in the relevant phases were annulled.

Final Four

References 

European North Basketball League
ENBL
2021–22 in Estonian basketball
2021–22 in Latvian basketball
2021–22 in Polish basketball
2021–22 in Lithuanian basketball
2021–22 in Czech basketball